Pooja Salvi is an Indian actress and model. In 2013, Pooja made her Bollywood debut in Rohan Sippy's romantic comedy Nautanki Saala!.

Career
Pooja Salvi modeled for LUX along with Aishwarya Rai Bachchan in a commercial which was directed by Rohan Sippy. She then appeared in commercials for brands like Cadbury, Tata Sky and Francis Alukkas.

Filmography

References

External links

Actresses from Gujarat
Living people
1988 births
People from Patan district
Actresses in Hindi cinema